The 2019 Canadian federal election in Newfoundland and Labrador was held on October 21, 2019 in the 7 electoral districts in the province of Newfoundland and Labrador.

The Liberal Party, led by Justin Trudeau, won 6 of the province's 7 seats, losing one seat to the New Democratic Party and seeing a significant decrease in its share of the popular vote. The Conservative Party, led by Andrew Scheer, did not win any seats but placed second in the popular vote.

Ridings

Avalon

Candidates
Matthew Chapman, teacher from Paradise (Conservative)
Greg Malone,  comedian from St. John's (Green)
Ken McDonald, incumbent MP from Conception Bay South (Liberal)
Lea Mary Movelle, activist from St. John's (NDP)

Results

Bonavista—Burin—Trinity

Results

Coast of Bays—Central—Notre Dame

Results

Labrador

Results

Long Range Mountains

Results

St. John's East

Results

St. John's South—Mount Pearl

Results

Results

Summary results

Full results

|- style="text-align:center;background-color:#e9e9e9"
|- style="text-align:center;background-color:#e9e9e9"
! rowspan="2" colspan="2" style="text-align:left;" | Party
! rowspan="2" style="text-align:left;" | Party leader
! rowspan="2" | Candidates
! colspan="5" | Seats
! colspan="5" | Popular vote
|- style="text-align:center;background-color:#e9e9e9"
|  2015
| style="font-size:80%" | Dissol.
| 2019
| style="font-size:80%" | % changefrom dissolution
| style="font-size:80%" | % seats
| style="font-size:80%" | Votes
| style="font-size:80%" | Votechange
| style="font-size:80%" |%
| style="font-size:80%" | pp change
| style="font-size:80%" | % whererunning
|-

| style="text-align:left;" |Justin Trudeau
| style="text-align:right;" |7
| style="text-align:right;" |7
| style="text-align:right;" |7
| style="text-align:right;" |6
| style="text-align:right;" |−14.29%
| style="text-align:right;" |
| style="text-align:right;" |109,148
| style="text-align:right;" |−56,270
| style="text-align:right;" |46.42%
| style="text-align:right;" |−18.07pp
| style="text-align:right;" |46.42%
|-

| style="text-align:left;" |Jagmeet Singh
| style="text-align:right;" |7
| style="text-align:right;" |0
| style="text-align:right;" |0
| style="text-align:right;" |1
| style="text-align:right;" |+14.29%
| style="text-align:right;" |
| style="text-align:right;" |57,664
| style="text-align:right;" |+3,544
| style="text-align:right;" |24.52%
| style="text-align:right;" |+3.42pp
| style="text-align:right;" |24.52%
|-

| style="text-align:left;" |Andrew Scheer
| style="text-align:right;" |7
| style="text-align:right;" |0
| style="text-align:right;" |0
| style="text-align:right;" |0
| style="text-align:right;" |
| style="text-align:right;" |
| style="text-align:right;" |59,821
| style="text-align:right;" |+33,352
| style="text-align:right;" |25.44%
| style="text-align:right;" |+15.12pp
| style="text-align:right;" |25.44%
|-

| style="text-align:left;" |Elizabeth May
| style="text-align:right;" |7
| style="text-align:right;" |0
| style="text-align:right;" |0
| style="text-align:right;" |0
| style="text-align:right;" |
| style="text-align:right;" |
| style="text-align:right;" |7,617
| style="text-align:right;" |+4,845
| style="text-align:right;" |3.24%
| style="text-align:right;" |+2.06pp
| style="text-align:right;" |3.24%
|-

| style="text-align:left;" |Randy David Joy
| style="text-align:right;" |1
| style="text-align:right;" 
| style="text-align:right;" |0
| style="text-align:right;" |0
| style="text-align:right;" |
| style="text-align:right;" |
| style="text-align:right;" |411
| style="text-align:right;" |*
| style="text-align:right;" |0.17%
| style="text-align:right;" |*
| style="text-align:right;" |1.07%
|-

| style="text-align:left;" |Maxime Bernier
| style="text-align:right;" |1
| style="text-align:right;" 
| style="text-align:right;" |0
| style="text-align:right;" |0
| style="text-align:right;" |
| style="text-align:right;" |
| style="text-align:right;" |335
| style="text-align:right;" |*
| style="text-align:right;" |0.14%
| style="text-align:right;" |*
| style="text-align:right;" |0.82%
|-

| style="text-align:left;" |Rod Taylor
| style="text-align:right;" |1
| style="text-align:right;" |0
| style="text-align:right;" |0
| style="text-align:right;" |0
| style="text-align:right;" |
| style="text-align:right;" |
| style="text-align:right;" |141
| style="text-align:right;" |*
| style="text-align:right;" |0.06%
| style="text-align:right;" |*
| style="text-align:right;" |0.35%
|-
! colspan="15"|
|-
| colspan="3" style="text-align:left;" |Blank and invalid votes 
| —
| —
| —
| —
| —
| —
| 3,611
| +2,726
| 1.51%
| +0.46pp
| —
|-
| colspan="3" style="text-align:left;" |Total
|31
|7
|7
|7
| —
|100.00%
| style="text-align:center;" |238,748
| style="text-align:center;" |-20,777
| style="text-align:center;" |100.00%
| style="text-align:center;" | —
| style="text-align:center;" |100.00%
|-
| colspan="3" style="text-align:left;" |Registered voters/turnout
| —
| —
| —
| —
| —
| — 
| 416,095
| -1,374
| 57.38%
| −4.79pp
| —
|-
| style="text-align:left;" colspan="15" | Source: Elections Canada (Official Voting Results)
<noinclude>

References

2019 Canadian federal election
Canadian federal elections in Newfoundland and Labrador